The 1998 World Cup of Golf took place 19–22 November at the Gulf Harbor Country Club in Auckland, New Zealand. It was the 44th World Cup. The tournament was a 72-hole stroke play team event (32 teams) with each team consisting of two players from a country. The combined score of each team determined the team results. Individuals also competed for the International Trophy. The prize money totaled $1,500,000 with $400,000 going to the winning pair and $100,000 to the top individual. The English team of David Carter and Nick Faldo won by two strokes over the Italian team of Massimo Florioli and Costantino Rocca. American Scott Verplank took the International Trophy by one stroke over Faldo and Rocca.

Teams

Source

Scores
Team

Source

International Trophy

Source

References

World Cup (men's golf)
Golf tournaments in New Zealand
Sport in Auckland
World Cup golf
World Cup golf
World Cup golf